Ingmārs Līdaka (born 13 August 1966, Vecumnieki) is a Latvian zoologist and politician who has represented the Union of Greens and Farmers in the Saeima, the Latvian national parliament.

Prior to entering politics, Līdaka worked at Riga Zoo as a public relations specialist. He entered politics in 1995 when he was elected to Riga City Council and was later elected to the Saeima. He became better known following a parliamentary debate on when to fly the Latvian national flag in 2009 when, after his speech was interrupted by members of other parties, he shouted "Aizver muti!" (shut your mouth!) This became a popular phrase in Latvia, with the YouTube video of the incident receiving over 85,000 views and numerous T-shirts bearing the phrase being sold. Līdaka also authored a book Zoodārzs manā pagalmā (The zoo in my backyard.)

In March 2018, he resigned from the Saeima to become head of Riga Zoo.

References

1966 births
Living people
People from Bauska Municipality
Latvian Green Party politicians
Deputies of the 9th Saeima
Deputies of the 10th Saeima
Deputies of the 11th Saeima
Deputies of the 12th Saeima
Deputies of the 14th Saeima
Latvian zoologists